Soju is the former stage name of Tony Hyunsoo Ha, a South Korean-American retired drag queen, singer and television/YouTube personality. Soju is best known for her online reviews of the reality show RuPaul's Drag Race, until being cast on the show's eleventh season.

Early life 
Ha was born on May 12, 1991, in Seoul, South Korea. His family moved to Cedar Rapids, Iowa when he was ten years old, due to his father’s military background. He came out as gay when he was 21 and his drag mother is Kahmora Hall. Ha's original drag name was Soju Love, but later shortened to just Soju, which is taken from the drink of the same name.

Career 
Outside of drag, Ha is the owner of a taekwondo academy.

Soju was announced as one of fifteen contestants on the eleventh season of RuPaul's Drag Race on January 24, 2019. She was eliminated in the first episode after doing poorly in the sewing challenge and losing a lip sync to "The Best of Both Worlds" by Hannah Montana against Kahanna Montrese. A conversation between Soju and the judges about a cyst became a viral meme within the Drag Race fandom.

After season eleven, YouTuber Miles Jai became the co-host for the third season of Shot with Soju. Comedian Margaret Cho appeared in the first episode of the season in March 2019. Soju is one of the founders and performers of the touring LGBTQ+ K-Pop drag show Seoul Train Party. She appeared in the music video for Lizzo's song "Juice" on April 17, 2019.

Music 
Soju released her first single "So Juicy" with a music video on January 11, 2018. Her second single, "K-Pop Idol Reject" featuring Edward Avila was released on November 6, 2018. In an interview with Billboard, Soju stated, "We want to bring more foreigners, we want to see queer people in K-pop. It's slowly changing - the industry is very conservative and very old school, so it will take a while for them to change. But it's happening."

Personal life
Soju lives in Chicago, as of 2017. On January 21, 2021, Soju was accused of sexual assault. On March 9, 2021, Soju announced that she had quit drag to focus on her mental health and that she wouldn't be returning.  In 2022 Soju returned to Instagram and has refused to address questions about these allegations.

Filmography

Television

Music videos

Web series

Discography

Singles

References

External links 

 Soju on Discogs

1991 births
Living people
20th-century LGBT people
21st-century LGBT people
American gay musicians
American LGBT people of Asian descent
American LGBT singers
American people of Korean descent
Asian-American drag queens
Gay entertainers
LGBT people from Iowa
LGBT YouTubers
People from Chicago
People from Seoul
Soju
South Korean drag queens